, also known as Inaba Ittetsu (稲葉 一鉄), was a Japanese samurai warrior in the Sengoku period. served the Saitō clan of Mino province. Later, he become a retainer of Oda Nobunaga.

Biography
His childhood name was Hikoshiro later Hikoroku. In 1567, they agreed together to join the forces of Oda Nobunaga.
  
He took part in the Siege of Inabayama Castle (1567) and participated in the Battle of Anegawa (1570), led the reverse troops of Oda Nobunaga's forces. Later, he fought in the Siege of Ishiyama-Honganji, Siege of Ichijodani Castle, Siege of Nagashima, Battle of Nagashino, and Kaga campaign under Shibata Katsuie.

His son, Inaba Masanari, was the husband of Saitō Fuku. Ittetsu himself lived and went into the service of Hideyoshi Toyotomi serving at Battle of Shizugatake and the Battle of Komaki-Nagakute before dying in 1589.

Family
 Father: Inaba Michinori
 Mother: Isshiki Yoshito's daughter
 Wife: Sanjonishi Saneki's daughter
 Concubine: daughter of Kanou Family
 Children:
 daughter married Horiichi Hannosuke
 daughter married Kunie Shigemoto
 Inaba Shigemichi (d.1598) by daughter of Kanou Family
 Inaba Sadamichi (1546–1603) by Sanjonishi Saneki's daughter
 Inaba Naomasa
 Inaba Masamichi (1566-1640)
 Yasuhime married Saito Toshimitsu
 daughter married Marumo Kanetoshi
 daughter married Yamamura Yoshikatsu

See also
Siege of Inabayama Castle
Battle of Anegawa

References

Samurai
1515 births
1588 deaths
Inaba clan